Ma Se-geon (born January 24, 1994) is a South Korean left-handed épée fencer and 2021 team Olympic bronze medalist.

Medal Record

Olympic Games

References

1994 births
Living people
People from Busan
Sportspeople from Busan
South Korean male épée fencers
Olympic fencers of South Korea
Fencers at the 2020 Summer Olympics
Olympic medalists in fencing
Olympic bronze medalists for South Korea
Medalists at the 2020 Summer Olympics